Fermin or Fermín is a surname and masculine given name, the Spanish form of Firmin. Notable people include:

Surname
 Anna Fermin (born 1902), American folk/country singer and songwriter
 Cristy Fermin (born 1956), Filipino talk show host.
 Freddy Fermín (born 1995), Venezuelan baseball player
 Iamdra Fermín (born 1984), Dominican TV hostess, emcee, and actress

Given name
 Fermin Rocker (born 1907), British painter and book illustrator
 Fermín Cacho (born 1969), Spanish track and field athlete
 Fermín IV (born 1974), Mexican rapper & pastor
 Fermín Toro (born 1806), Venezuelan humanist, politician, diplomat and author
 Fermín Tangüis (born 1851), Puerto Rican businessman, agriculturist and scientist
 Fermín Salvochea (born 1842), former mayor of the city of Cádiz
 Fermín Trueba (born 1914), former Spanish cyclist
 Fermín Francisco de Carvajal-Vargas (born 1722), 1st Duke of San Carlos and Grandee of Spain
 Fermín Zanón Cervera (born 1875), Spanish zoologist

References

Spanish masculine given names